Sig used as a name may refer to:
Sig (given name)
Sig, Algeria, a city on the banks of the Sig River
Sig Alert, an alert for traffic congestion in California, named after Loyd Sigmon
Sig River, a river of Algeria also known as Mekerra

sig (lower case) may refer to:
sig (rune), an Armanen rune, later used for the Schutzstaffel (SS) logo
sig, the distinctive hand actions of sign language that form words; see movement (sign language)
 .sig, a signature block in e-mail messaging

sig as a loanword may refer to:
sig (Russian), the common whitefish; see Coregonus
Sig (Italian), abbreviation of Signore ("Lord")
Sig. (Latin, also Signa or Signatura), the "signature" section of a medical prescription, which contains directions to the patient, and the signature of the prescribing doctor
Sig. Signaling ( in Rail transport) the signals and associated equipment required for their operation.

SIG (capitalized) may refer to:
SIG, the IATA Callsign of Fernando Luis Ribas Dominicci Airport in San Juan, Puerto Rico
SIG (band), a Finnish band
SIG Combibloc Group, a Swiss-German packaging company and former railway vehicle and firearms manufacturer
SIG plc, a British insulation company, formerly Sheffield Insulations Group plc
SIG Sauer, the brand name used by firearms manufacturers SIG Sauer Inc. of the United States and SIG Sauer GmbH of Germany
 S.I.G., the affirmative call sign (meaning "Spectrum Is Green") used by characters in the 1960s British TV series Captain Scarlet and the Mysterons
the 15 cm sIG 33 (or Schweres Infanterie Geschütz) a German-made infantry gun used in World War II
Susquehanna International Group, a privately held global trading and technology firm

SIG may also be used as an acronym to refer to:
Särskilda Inhämtningsgruppen, a special forces unit of the Swedish Defence Forces, active 2007–2011
Schweizerische Industrie Gesellschaft, the original name of SIG Combibloc Group
Science Initiative Group, an international team of scientists dedicated to fostering science in developing countries
Semen Indonesia Group, an Indonesian state-owned building materials manufacturer
Shanghai International Group, state-owned financial services corporation
Special Interest Group, a community with a common technical interest
 Examples include: Aviation SIG, Bluetooth SIG, Small Form Factor SIG
Special Interrogation Group, the British Army unit of German-speaking Jewish volunteers in World War II
Special Investigation Group, a New Zealand government group
Strasbourg IG (Strasbourg Illkirch-Graffenstaden Basket), a French basketball club

See also
Signature (disambiguation)
Sigg (disambiguation)